Ian Collins (born 22 November 1962) is a British former swimmer. 

Collins attended Millfield School from 1975 to 1981. He competed in two events at the 1984 Summer Olympics. He represented England in the 200 and 400 metres individual medley events, at the 1982 Commonwealth Games in Brisbane, Queensland, Australia. At the ASA National British Championships he won the 200 metres medley title in 1982.

References

External links
 

1962 births
Living people
British male swimmers
Olympic swimmers of Great Britain
Swimmers at the 1984 Summer Olympics
Swimmers at the 1982 Commonwealth Games
Sportspeople from Wolverhampton
Commonwealth Games competitors for England
People educated at Millfield
20th-century British people